Periophthalmus is a genus of fish in the family Oxudercidae, native to coastal mangrove wood and shrubland in the Indo-Pacific region, except for P. barbarus from the Atlantic coast of Africa. It is one of the genera commonly known as mudskippers.  Periophthalmus fishes are remarkable for being able to live, temporarily, in open air where they feed with insects and small invertebrates; out of water they have limited motion abilities, such as jumping.  All Periophthalmus species are aggressive and territorial.

Species
There are currently 19 recognized species in this genus

 Periophthalmus argentilineatus Valenciennes, 1837 (Barred mudskipper)
 Periophthalmus barbarus (Linnaeus, 1766) (Atlantic mudskipper)
 Periophthalmus chrysospilos Bleeker, 1852
 Periophthalmus darwini Larson & Takita, 2004 (Darwin's mudskipper)
 Periophthalmus gracilis Eggert, 1935 (Graceful mudskipper)
 Periophthalmus kalolo Lesson, 1831 (Common mudskipper)
 Periophthalmus magnuspinnatus Y. J. Lee, Y. Choi & B. S. Ryu, 1995
 Periophthalmus malaccensis Eggert, 1935
 Periophthalmus minutus Eggert, 1935 (Minute mudskipper)
 Periophthalmus modestus Cantor, 1842 (Shuttles mudskipper)
 Periophthalmus novaeguineaensis Eggert, 1935 (New Guinea mudskipper)
 Periophthalmus novemradiatus (F. Hamilton, 1822) (Pearse's mudskipper)
 Periophthalmus pusing Jaafar, Polgar & Zamroni, 2016
 Periophthalmus spilotus Murdy & Takita, 1999
 Periophthalmus takita Jaafar & Larson, 2008 (Takita's mudskipper)
 Periophthalmus variabilis Eggert, 1935
 Periophthalmus walailakae Darumas & Tantichodok, 2002 
 Periophthalmus waltoni Koumans, 1941 (Walton's mudskipper)
Periophthalmus weberi Eggert, 1935 (Weber's mudskipper)

References

 
Oxudercinae
Mudskippers
Ray-finned fish genera
Taxa named by Marcus Elieser Bloch
Taxa named by Johann Gottlob Theaenus Schneider